Time Bank may refer to:

 Time Banking, the practice of reciprocal service exchange which uses units of time as currency
 Time Bank Zimbabwe, a commercial bank in Zimbabwe
 Times Bank, a commercial bank in India, currently a subsidiary of the HDFC Bank